Alampalayam is a panchayat town in Udumalpet  in the state of Tamil Nadu, India.

References

Cities and towns in Namakkal district